Appalachian Blues is the fifth studio album by singer Stella Parton. It is a plaintive collection of songs which combine country with hints of blues, gospel and folk.  This album displays Parton's unique vocal styling plus her creative songwriting.

Tracks 
"Up In The Hollar" - 3:49
"Child Of My Body" - 2:58
"Lover's Dream" - 2:57
"Wayfaring Stranger" - 3:45
"The Missing Part" - 3:43
"I'll Think About Shadows" - 3:08
"I'll Draw From The Well" - 4:12
"One Honest Love" - 2:58
"Songbird's Heart" - 2:53
"Satisfied Mind" - 4:17

References 

2001 albums
Stella Parton albums